"L'union fait la force" is also the French-language version of the national mottos of Haiti, Belgium, Bulgaria, and Acadia.

L'Union fait la force (literally Unity Makes Strength or Strength Through Unity) is a French language game show airing weekdays on Ici Radio-Canada Télé. It is hosted by Patrice L'Écuyer.

The content of the show are primarily "quizzes" that pertain to words in the French language. The quizzes range from everything from guessing words (in which the vowels are removed) all the way up to Pictionary-style games.

The game consists of two teams, made up of four competitors and supporters behind them. The team represents the organization.  The teams compete for points via the abovementioned "quizzes". The team that earns the most points wins a prize of C$1,000.

Tuesday and Thursday editions of the show include a special round, La petite école ("The Little School"), in which contestants answer questions written by elementary and secondary school students, with each question pertaining to a grade level (similar to Are You Smarter Than a 5th Grader?).

External links
 L'union fait la force

2000s Canadian game shows
2010s Canadian game shows
Ici Radio-Canada Télé original programming
Television shows filmed in Montreal
2003 Canadian television series debuts
2015 Canadian television series endings